Petty morel is a common name for several plants and may refer to:

Solanum nigrum, black nightshade, a Eurasian plant
Aralia racemosa, an American plant of ornamental value